is a passenger railway station located in the city of Nantan, Kyoto Prefecture, Japan, operated by West Japan Railway Company (JR West).

Lines

Station layout
The station consists of one ground-level island platform connected to the station building by a level crossing. The station is staffed.

Platforms

History
With the privatization of the Japan National Railways (JNR) on April 1, 1987, the station came under the aegis of the West Japan Railway Company.

Passenger statistics
In fiscal 2018, the station was used by an average of 538 passengers daily.

Surrounding area
 Nantan City Hall Hiyoshi Branch
 Nantan Municipal Tonda Elementary School
 Nantan Municipal Tonda Junior High School

See also
List of railway stations in Japan

References

External links

 Station Official Site

Railway stations in Kyoto Prefecture
Sanin Main Line
Railway stations in Japan opened in 1910
Nantan, Kyoto